Savandapur is a panchayat in Gobichettipalayam taluk in Erode District of Tamil Nadu state, India.

Location
Savandapur is located on the banks of River Bhavani with Athani located on the other side of it. There are two bridges across the river that connect Savandapur with Athani. Savandapur lies along the major district road (MDR) connecting Gobichettipalayam with Anthiyur.

Demographics
It has a population of about 3,743 with over 1,325 households. Kongu Vellalar families maintain a dominant position in the village and the surrounding area.

Temples
The other famous temples in and around Savandapur are Karungaradu Murugan Temple, Arulmigu Selliandi Amman Temple, Arulmigu Poonthottathu Aiyan Temple, Arulmigu Vinayagar and Selva Mariamman Temple, and Arulmigu Vayal Karuppsamy Temple.

References

Villages in Erode district